This is a list of earthquakes in 2020. Only earthquakes of magnitude 6 or above are included, unless they result in damage and/or casualties, or are notable for other reasons. All dates are listed according to UTC time. Maximum intensities are indicated on the Modified Mercalli intensity scale and are sourced from United States Geological Survey (USGS) ShakeMap data. For the second consecutive year, activity was well below average, with only nine major quakes, it was also the first year since 2016 with no magnitude 8.0+ earthquakes. With just over 200 casualties reported, it is the least deadliest year in the 21st century for earthquakes, but almost all of them came from Turkey, struck by three deadly events. In the last days of the year, Croatia experienced one of its strongest earthquakes in its history, with casualties and structural damage.

Compared to other years

An increase in detected earthquake numbers does not necessarily represent an increase in earthquakes per se. Population increase, habitation spread, and advances in earthquake detection technology all contribute to higher earthquake numbers being recorded over time.

By death toll

Listed are earthquakes with at least 10 dead.

By magnitude

Listed are earthquakes with at least 7.0 magnitude.

By month

January

February

March

April

May

June

July

August

September

October

November

December

See also
 
 Lists of earthquakes 
 Lists of 21st-century earthquakes 
 Lists of earthquakes by year

References

2020
2020
 
2020 natural disasters
2020-related lists